Ryan Lee Baldacchino (born 13 January 1981) is an English professional footballer who plays for Australian club Hume City. He is capable of playing at both defensive midfield, and winger. Previous clubs include Blackburn Rovers, Bolton, Carlisle and Gretna over a 10-year professional career.

Career
Ryan Baldacchino began his footballing career at Blackburn Rovers in 1996 as a promising winger capable of playing on either wing. With Blackburn, he went on to win the U17 Premier League and reach the FA Youth Cup final, playing in front of a 25,000-strong crowd against an Everton team featuring future Premiership footballers Leon Osman, Francis Jeffers, Richard Dunne and Michael Ball.

Baldacchino went on to become a reserve team regular in forthcoming seasons and was rewarded with a four-year professional contract, but was transferred to Blackburn's local rivals Bolton Wanderers in March 2000 as comparisons to his former Blackburn teammates Damien Duff and David Dunn were made by his new manager Sam Allardyce and assistant manager Phil Brown. He was awarded squad number 33.

With pace to burn and accurate crossing ability Baldacchino soon showed his potential in Bolton's reserve side and in pre-season games for the first team. However, the signings of Jay-Jay Okocha and Youri Djorkaeff hindered his chances of making a first-team breakthrough and he left Bolton after only 18 months, signing with Carlisle United on a three-year deal. Baldacchino was an instant hit with the club with an outstanding display of pace and trickery to help defeat Southend United away in his first match. Baldacchino was a regular for Carlisle before being prised away by Brooks Mileson and the spending power of Scottish club Gretna. Gretna, with their newfound wealth, won Scottish Third, Second and First Division titles in consecutive seasons, with Baldacchino one of the club's star players; he and Gretna teammates Kenny Deuchar, Gavin Skelton and Chris Innes gained the prestigious accolade of being the only four players in 100 years of Scottish football history to play in all Scottish football divisions with the same team. Baldacchino's time with Gretna saw him win countless man of the match award, the goal of the season award and even score a goal in the UEFA Europa League. An impressive display against Dunfermline Athletic in the Scottish Cup in front of then-Celtic manager Gordon Strachan earned Baldacchino rave reviews, Hibs, Motherwell and Celtic all had regular checks on Baldacchino. Brooks Mileson once again showed his spending power and ambition by keeping hold of Baldacchino and he signed a new improved four-year deal in December 2005 making him one of the club's top earners.

Gretna arrived in style to the SPL breaking all records on their way and many players staying loyal to Gretna turning away potential big money moves on the way.
The season 2007–08 was to be Gretna's last year as a club as they bowed out at the top when owner Brooks Mileson took ill in late February. Baldacchino was given squad number 7 and played against Rangers and Celtic that season as Gretna struggled to cope with life in the top flight. They were relegated at the end of the season.

Baldacchino transferred to VPL club Altona Magic in May 2008 and one year later he signed for New South Wales Premier League outfit Bonnyrigg White Eagles. Before moving to Forest Hill Milford United on a free transfer, and Hume City also a free transfer.

References

External links 
 http://www.sportinmalta.com/i-want-to-play-for-malta-ryan-baldacchino/
 Maltese connections

1981 births
Footballers from Leicester
Blackburn Rovers F.C. players
Bolton Wanderers F.C. players
Carlisle United F.C. players
People with acquired Maltese citizenship
Maltese footballers
English footballers
English people of Maltese descent
Association football midfielders
Gretna F.C. players
Living people
Scottish Premier League players
Scottish Football League players
Expatriate soccer players in Australia
Bonnyrigg White Eagles FC players
Ayr United F.C. players
Hume City FC players